ITU School of Architecture, is the first institution in Ottoman Empire that educate students about architecture. Department of Architecture is substantially equivalent to the programs in the United States. Famous architectures such as Ord. Prof. Emin Onat, Prof. Paul Bonatz, Prof. Said Kuran, Prof. Mukbil Gökdoğan, Prof. Kemal Ahmet Aru, Prof. Clemens Holzmeister, Prof. Gustav Olsner, Prof. Rudolf Belling, Prof. Orhan Arda was the members of School of Architecture. School of Architecture is in Taşkışla building, in Beyoğlu and has five departments:

 Architecture
 Industrial Product Design
 Interior Architecture
 Landscape Architecture
 Urban and Regional Planning

Notable alumni 
 Ord. Prof. Emin Halid Onat
 Prof. Ahmet Orhan Arda

References

External links 
 ITU School of Architecture
 Department of Architecture 
 Department of Urban and Regional Planning
 Department of Industrial Product Design
 Department of Interior Architecture
 Department of Landscape Architecture

Istanbul Technical University
Educational institutions established in 1884
1884 establishments in the Ottoman Empire